The 2009–10 Perth Glory FC season was the club's 13th season since its establishment in 1996. The club competed in the A-League for the 5th time. Perth Glory changed their logo and for the first time in their A-League history chose to include vertical purple and white stripes on their home kit this season.

Season expectations were very high with Perth Glory's owner Tony Sage allowing manager David Mitchell to sign High calibre players like former Bolton defender Andy Todd and former Ajax midfielder Viktor Sikora who was on loan to Perth from FC Dallas the previous season. The club also managed to secure Socceroos Jacob Burns, Mile Sterjovski and Chris Coyne. Both Sage and Mitchell's intentions were to restore Perth's footballing past and challenge for an A-League finals spot. At one stage of the campaign the Glory were pushing to claim top spot and the league but a run of poor form and injuries cost the team and only managed to hold on to their final league position of 5th which equalled their best A-League finish in 2005–2006.

Perth Glory were knocked out of the A-League finals when they took part in a 1–1 draw against the Wellington Phoenix in Wellington which they lost to penalties and thus ended Perth's best season of the A-League so far.

Current squad for 2009–10 season

A-League squad

Squad changes for 2009–10 season
In:
 Victor Sikora – From FC Dallas 
 Andy Todd – From Derby County 
 Jacob Burns – From FC Unirea Urziceni 
 Branko Jelic – From Energie Cottbus 
 Aleks Vrteski – From FK Pobeda 
 Mile Sterjovski – From Derby County 
 Chris Coyne – From Colchester United 
 Todd Howarth – From Perth SC 

Out:
 James Robinson – To North Queensland Fury 
 Nikolai Topor-Stanley – To Newcastle United Jets 
 Jason Petkovic – Retired
 Dino Djulbic – To Rot Weiss Ahlen 
 Nikita Rukavytsya – To FC Twente 
 Nick Rizzo – To Central Coast Mariners
 Hayden Foxe – Released
 Adrian Trinidad – To Persiba Balikpapan 
 Mark Lee – Released
 David Tarka – Released
 Josip Magdic – Released
 Frank Juric – Retired
 Eugene Dadi – Released
 Amaral – Nine Match guest player contract completed

Friendlies

Home and away season

The 2009–10 A-League season will be played over 27 rounds, followed by a finals series.

2009–10 Hyundai A-League fixtures

2009-10 Finals series

Season statistics 
(Current as of Round 27)

Leading scorers 
Perth Glory A-League Top Scorers

Discipline

Home attendance

References

2009-10
2009–10 A-League season by team